Givova is an Italian manufacturing company located in Scafati. The company, founded in 2008 by Giovanni Acanfora, produces a wide range of sports equipment (mainly focused on the association football market but also covering other sports) that includes kit uniforms, football balls, and other sportswear. Givova's also markets casual wear and accessories.

In 2018 the quality of Givova sportswear jerseys made world wide attention in a story on involving the intersection of global sportswear brands, World cup teams, and international sanctions against Iran. On 14 June 2018, the New York Times reported that sanctions against Iran blocked the 2018 Iranian World Cup football team from using quality sportswear brands and limited the Iranian team to use other sportswear that were exempt from sanctions, such as Givova.

In Belgium, the relatively new brand gained national attention when they announced their sponsorship of the Brussels-based football club FC ITT Gecko, renowned for their attractive brand of attacking football. FC ITT Gecko president Mr. Joeri Wei held a three-hour long press conference to celebrate the partnership with Givova, a sports moment that dominated the Belgian sports media for weeks. In 2017, after FC ITT Gecko had secured promotion to the highest division, the club announced that they were looking forward to a long-lasting and successful collaboration with Givova at the very highest level of Belgian football.

Sponsorships
Teams and athletes using Givova equipment are:

Olympic Committees
  Venezuela

Basketball

Club teams

  Hapoel Jerusalem    (from 2021-2022 season).
  Brixia Basket
  Azzurro Basket Napoli    (from 2021-2022 season).
  Battipagliese Basket 
  ASD Del Fes Avellino  (from 2022-2023 season). 
  Dike Basket Napoli 
  Napoli   (from 2021-2022 season). 
  Basket Nord Barese
  Juvecaserta Basket 
  San Martino di Lupari
  Scafati Basket
  Mens Sana Siena 
 Espoir BBC
  Galatasaray
  Urunday Universitario

Beach Soccer

Club teams

   Catania
   Nettuno

Football

National teams

Non-national representative teams
  Luhansk 
  Padania 
  Székely Land  (from 2023)
  Two Sicilies

Referees
Givova is also the official referee kits supplier for the leagues:

  Liga FUTVE

Club teams

  Apolonia
  Delvina
  Elbasani 
  Spartaku
  CF Atlètic Amèrica
  Carroi
  Acassuso 
  Gimnasia y Esgrima La Plata 
  Newell's Old Boys 
  Talleres (C) 
  Balmain Tigers FC
  FK Olimpic
  Radnik 
  FK Velež Mostar
  Brasília Futebol Clube
  Tombense Futebol Clube
  Litex Lovech
  Strumska Slava
  FC Oshmyany
  FC Naftan
  Lautaro
  APEP
  Chalkanoras Idaliou
  Nea Salamina
  PAEEK FC
  P.O. Xylotymbou
  SK DFO Pardubice 
  Inter de Bayaguana
  Foxton Football Club Reserves 
  Hogweed Hares FC
  Margate FC
  Oxford Bierbarians
  Hockering FC
  Salt Quay Albion
  Whey Beys
  Real de Banjul FC
  TuS 06 Roxheim
  Gibraltar Scorpions FC
  Lynx
  Mons Calpe
  Lincoln  (from 2021/2022 Season)
  Panetolikos F.C.
  Trikala F.C.
  Lombard-Pápa TFC
  Nyíregyháza Spartacus FC
  FC Veszprém
  Pécsi MFC
  Beitar Jerusalem 
  Bnei Sakhnin F.C.
  Hapoel Acre F.C. 
  Hapoel Afula F.C. 
  Hapoel Nazareth Illit F.C. 
  Hapoel Jerusalem F.C. 
  Ironi Nesher F.C. 
  Hapoel Ra'anana A.F.C. 
  Albissola 2010 
  U.S. Arzanese
  Carrarese
  Casale  (from 2022-2023 season).
  Cavese
  Celano F.C. Marsica
  Due Torri
  Fidelis Andria 
  Fondi
  Gelbison
  Giugliano 
  S.S. Ischia Isolaverde
  Juve Stabia 
  Mantova F.C.
  Matera
  Messina
  Mezzolara
  A.S.G. Nocerina
  Paganese 
  Picerno 
  Pomigliano (Female)
  Pordenone
  Pro Patria 
  Reggina  (from 2022-2023 season).
  Scafatese 
  Terracina
  Torres (Male)
  Bouaké
  Al-Ahli SC (Amman)
  Ramtha
  Al-Wehdat SC 
  Drenica  (from 2021-2022 season)
  Malisheva  (from 2021-2022 season)
  Al Jahra SC 
  Al-Sulaibikhat SC
  Al-Sahel SC 
  Qadsia SC 
  Burgan SC
  FC Jūrmala
  Alittihad Misurata
  Tauras
  FC Wiltz 71
  Gudja United F.C.
  Senglea Athletic F.C.
  Żurrieq F.C.
  FK Lovćen 
  FK Mladost Podgorica
  AS Magenta 
  Fortuna Sittard
  Akademija Pandev
  FK Makedonija Gjorče Petrov
  FK Skopje
  FK Lofoten
  Leirsund A-Lag
  Miedź Legnica
  Atletico Clube de Portugal
  Futebol Clube Goleganense
  Al Shahania 
  Miroslava
  FC Zvezda Saint Petersburg
  NK Peca 
  NK Brežice 
  Folgore Falciano 
  Pennarossa
  Al-Batin F.C.
  Al Merrikh   (from 2022/2023 season)
  Gartcairn Maggie's
  North Merchiston AFC 
  Car Konstantin
  Mačva Šabac
  Napredak Kruševac
  Högsrums FF
  Córdoba 
  Eldense 
  UP Langreo 
  Marbella
  Sant Andreu
  Unión Club Ceares
  Robinhood
  Syracuse Pulse
  AS Vénus
  Newtown
  Prestatyn Town FC

Futsal

Club teams
  Hogweed Hares FC since 2017
  Acireale Calcio a 5
  Catania F.C. Librino Calcio a 5

Handball

National teams

Club teams
  Ariosto Pallamano Ferrara
  Pallamano femminile Mestrino
  Salerno

Minifootball

National teams
  Switzerland

Association
AFC Sofia Bar Association

Rugby

Club teams
  Torre del Greco Rugby

Volley

Club teams
  Asse-Lennik (Since 2020/21 season)
  Polisportiva Antares Sala Consilina
  Casalmaggiore (Since 2020/21 season)
  Cerignola
  Cuneo Granda Volley
  Olbia Volley
  Volley Academy Sassuolo
  ASD Volley Scafati
  Volley Tricolore Reggio Emilia
  C.D. Rio Duero de Soria (Since 2017/18 season)

Waterpolo

National teams

Charity teams and Tv Showes
  Battiti Live
  Grande Fratello
  L'isola dei famosi
  Miss Italia
  Nazionale Caantanti
  Nazionale Medici
  Nazionale Magistrati
  Nazionale Pilati
  Nazionale Calcio Trapiantati
  Performer Italian Cup
  Telethon Team 
  Charity Monaco Star Team

Showbitz and Singers
 Giovanni Ciacci
 Paolo Vallesi

References

External links

Sportswear brands
Shoe brands
Shoe companies of Italy
2008 establishments in Italy
Sporting goods manufacturers of Italy
Italian brands
Clothing companies established in 2008